OSTRAVAR Aréna (previously ČEZ Aréna, due to sponsorship reasons) is an indoor arena used mainly for ice hockey matches, in Vítkovice, Ostrava, Czech Republic. It opened in 1986, and underwent a € 23.3 million renovation between  2003 and 2004. The arena hosts home games of ice hockey club HC Vítkovice.

The capacity of the arena is 9,779, plus 16 skyboxes, making it the fourth-largest hockey venue in the Czech Republic. The rink can be converted into seating for concerts, increasing the capacity to 12,500.

History

In November 2003, the arena was given the name ČEZ Aréna, from July 2015 its name was Ostrava Aréna. It was renamed OSTRAVAR Aréna after the local Ostravar Brewery in 2016.

In May 2011, Ostrava's Deputy Mayor for Investment, Jiří Srba, announced a plan to invest 10 million CZK in the stadium in the same year.

Events
The arena has hosted numerous international sporting events in its history.

In ice hockey, it was the main venue for the 1994 and 2020 IIHF World Junior Championships. The arena was the secondary venue for the 2004 and 2015 Men's World Ice Hockey Championships with Prague's O2 Arena.

Events in other sports include the 1986 FIVB Women's World Championship, the 2005 UEFA Futsal Championship, group stage matches of the 2008 Men's World Floorball Championships. In 2010, the arena hosted the Table Tennis European Championships and the 2010 FIBA World Championship for Women. The Czech Republic Davis Cup team has also played at the arena.

See also
 List of indoor arenas in the Czech Republic
 List of European ice hockey arenas

References

External links

Official website

Buildings and structures in Ostrava
Indoor arenas in the Czech Republic
Indoor ice hockey venues in the Czech Republic
Sports venues in the Moravian-Silesian Region
1986 establishments in Czechoslovakia
Sports venues completed in 1986
20th-century architecture in the Czech Republic